Urban planning in Shanghai refers to various phases of planning and development of the city of Shanghai, one of the largest cities in China.

History 
Shanghai was traditionally a fishing and textiles town, and until the 1840s, despite the commercial importance as a major port, was considered a prefecture-level city, which is the lowest in China’s traditional hierarchy of urban settlements.

After the First Opium War (18391842) the 1842 Treaty of Nanking, Shanghai opened as one of the five Chinese treaty ports. The British and Americans, followed by the French, built their own concessions, mainly along the Suzhou Creek. During this period, western planning concepts were introduced and resulted in the creation of what became the Shanghai International Settlement.

Foreign settlement 1843-1929 
As a traditional Chinese city, by the mid-16th century, Shanghai had gained its massive walls, designed both to enclose the town and, formed as an oval ring around the dense buildings of the city, to divert the canals to form a moat. Prior to foreign settlements, initiated in 1840s, the city’s main streets had hardly changed.

Consul Balfour administrated the laying out of the settlement’s master plan, which including an area, mainly along the west bank of the Yangtze, between the Yangtze Creek at the southern end and close to the Suzhou Creek at the northern end.  The overall plan mirrored that of 19th-century London and included paved streets, a tram system, a pure and continuous water supply, and adequate sewage disposal. In a short time, the nucleus of Shanghai became a relatively modern, open urban structure, contrasting with the dense development of the Chinese city, and was considered by foreigners as a "Model Settlement".

The Greater Shanghai Plan 1929-1937 

In 1929, following the establishment of the city government of Greater Shanghai, the Nationalist Government of the Republic of China in 
Nanking formed a city planning commission composed of people from various backgrounds, including both Chinese experts and foreign consultants. The new commission published The Greater Shanghai Plan in July 1929. This included the redevelopment of the old Chinese district and a new city centre located in the Jiangwan District, between the site of a proposed new port and the International Settlement. Rail and future extensions of existing port facilities were considered in relation to the new site, as well as a proposed system of broad, rectilinear streets designed to alleviate Shanghai’s growing traffic  problems.

After Shanghai fell to the Japanese in 1937, the plan came to a halt. Any buildings that had been constructed under its guidance were destroyed during the subsequent occupation.

Post-war master planning 1945-1949 
In 1946, the Shanghai city planning board was established, in order to draft a master plan for Shanghai. Similar to post-war regional planning elsewhere, the Shanghai master plan placed a great deal of emphasis on its relationship with broader regional planning. For the first time, it was understood that a balanced development of hitherto underdeveloped areas on the other side of the river would benefit the city plan. This could be accomplished by bridging the river and by construction of a cross-river tunnel. However, due to the failure of the Nationalist Government to cope with China’s endemic problems, as well as the extraordinary burdens of post-war construction, the Plan was never totally implemented, and was finally abandoned after the retreat of the Kuomintang to Taiwan and the establishment of the People's Republic of China.

Planning in People’s Republic of China 1949-1980 
Between 1949 and 1956, under the umbrella of socialist construction, planning in Shanghai was limited to the restoration of all utilities, communication and transportation lines and other basic infrastructure improvements. From 1956, a massive urban renewal project was proposed for the Zhabei district in Shanghai, as well as the planned relocation of population and industry through the establishment of seven satellite towns around Shanghai.

The following two decades were dominated by deconstruction, as a direct result of a sequence of political movements, including the Great Leap Forward in 1958 and the Cultural Revolution from 1966 to 1976. It was not until the fall of the Gang of Four, and the adoption of China’s open policy in the late 1970s, that the deconstruction in Shanghai finally came to an end.

Notes

References 

 Alan Balfour, Zheng Shiling, (2002) World cities: Shanghai. London: Wiley-academy.
 Yue-man Yeung, Sung Yun-wing (1996)  Shanghai: transformation and modernization under China’s open policy. Hong Kong: Chinese University Press.

Geography of Shanghai
History of Shanghai
Politics of Shanghai
Shanghai